Zhang Xinsen (born July 1953) is a Chinese diplomat and formerly the Chinese Ambassador to South Korea.

Life and career
Zhang was born in Shanghai, in July 1953. He graduated from Beijing Foreign Studies University. He also studied at Chinese Academy of Governance and John F. Kennedy School of Government as a part-time student.

In November 2005 he was promoted to become the Chinese Ambassador to Ireland, a position he held until September 2007.

In September 2007, he was appointed the director of the Office of the Chinese Foreign Ministry, he remained in that position until March 2010, when he was transferred to Seoul, capital of South Korea, and appointed the Chinese Ambassador.

References

External links

1953 births
Beijing Foreign Studies University alumni
Chinese Academy of Governance alumni
Harvard Kennedy School alumni
Living people
Diplomats of the People's Republic of China
Ambassadors of China to South Korea
Ambassadors of China to Ireland